Favaro is an Italian surname that may refer to
Avis Favaro (born 1960), Canadian television reporter
Davide Favaro (born 1984), Italian football player
Roberto Favaro (born 1965), Italian rugby union player and coach
Simone Favaro (born 1988), Italian rugby union player, son of Roberto

See also
Favaro Veneto, an urban part in northern Italy

Italian-language surnames